Saint-Sébastien may refer to:

France
 Saint-Sébastien, Creuse, in the Creuse  département 
 Saint-Sébastien, Isère, in the Isère  département
 Saint-Sébastien-d'Aigrefeuille, in the Gard  département 
 Saint-Sébastien-de-Morsent, in the Eure  département
 Saint-Sébastien-de-Raids, in the Manche  département 
 Saint-Sébastien-sur-Loire, in the Loire-Atlantique  département

Canada
 Saint-Sébastien, Estrie, Quebec, Le Granit, Quebec
 Saint-Sébastien, Montérégie, Quebec, Le Haut-Richelieu, Quebec

See also
 Saint Sebastian, an early Christian saint and martyr
 San Sebastian (disambiguation)
 Sankt Sebastian, a former municipality in the district of Bruck-Mürzzuschlag in the Austrian province of Styria